Original flying boat alighting area in Bluff Harbour, Bluff, Southland, New Zealand. Controlled by the Bluff Harbour Board, was used by the RNZAF for flying boat operations (until 1966) when patrolling New Zealand's southern sub-Antarctic islands. Short Sunderland and Consolidated Catalina aircraft types were regular visitors.

In the late 1950s, Ansett Australia operated four chartered international flights using Short Sandringham flying boats. A local launch, small jetty and customs terminal was provided and passengers hurried onto buses for the short ride to Invercargill. This was an early attempt to open the southern region to mass tourism.

Eventually the flying boat era was replaced by more efficient land based airliners and the alighting area delisted as an airport.

References

Defunct airports in New Zealand
Transport in Southland, New Zealand
Bluff, New Zealand
Transport buildings and structures in Southland, New Zealand